Deh-e Now-e Jameh (also Romanized as Deh-e Now-e Jamʿeh; also known as Deh-e Now) is a village in Dehaj Rural District, Dehaj District, Shahr-e Babak County, Kerman Province, Iran. At the 2006 census, its population was 183, in 26 families.

References 

Populated places in Shahr-e Babak County